Melica violacea, is a species of grass in the family Poaceae endemic to Chile.

Description
The species is perennial and caespitose with thick butt sheaths which are forming a bulb. The species leaf-sheaths are tubular and pilose with one of their length being closed.

The species fertile spikelets are pediceled, the pedicels of which are ciliate, curved, hairy and filiform. Florets are diminished at the apex and have a pubescent callus.

Its lemma have a dentate apex while its surface is scaberulous. Both the lower and upper glumes are keelless, obovate and purple in colour, but have different size, apexes and surfaces. Palea itself is lanceolate, have ciliolated keels, with scabrous surface and is 2-veined. It fruits are caryopsis and have an additional pericarp.

References

violacea
Flora of South America
Taxa named by Antonio José Cavanilles